100 Derece, also known as 100 °C and Yüz Derece (meaning "100 Degrees") is a Turkish ska punk band. They describe their music as a "Punk'n Roll", which is a mixture of 1950s rock n'roll, 1960s reggae as well as 1980s and 1990s punk rock.

History
They drew inspiration from musical acts such as Siddhartha, Dawn, Barış 'Monkey's Popcorn, Cockroach (band), Emre 'Dimensions and Taxi. The band began performing regularly in concerts  and produced four demos in 2005. They were signed up by Ada Müzik and released their first album called Kahpe Felek in 2005. 100 Derece performed in several local and international festivals including H 2000, Rock İstanbul, Europe Music Fest. Between 2006 and 2007, the band was inactive due to the members being called up for military service. After their term ended, the band resumed its activities, eventually releasing the album Mavra.

Discography
Kahpe Felek (2005)
Mavra (2010)

References

External links
Official site

Turkish rock music groups
Turkish punk rock groups
Turkish reggae musical groups
Turkish ska groups